Kornél Marosvári (30 June 1943 – 30 May 2016) was a Hungarian sports shooter. He competed in the 50 metre pistol event at the 1972 Summer Olympics.

References

External links
 

1943 births
2016 deaths
Hungarian male sport shooters
Olympic shooters of Hungary
Shooters at the 1972 Summer Olympics
People from Baja, Hungary
Sportspeople from Bács-Kiskun County